Titanio ledereri is a species of moth in the family Crambidae. It is found in Hungary.

References

Moths described in 1870
Odontiini
Taxa named by Otto Staudinger